Louis Chevalier may refer to:

 Louis Chevalier (historian) (1911–2001), French historian
 Louis Chevalier (racewalker) (1921–2006), French racewalker